Anerastia lotella is a species of snout moth in the genus Anerastia. It was described by Jacob Hübner in 1813. It is found in most of Europe, western Russia, Asia Minor, Iran and western Turkestan. It has also been recorded from most of Canada.

The wingspan is 19–27 mm. Adults are on wing in July.

The larvae feed on various Poaceae species, including Ammophila arenaria, Corynephorus canescens and Festuca ovina. They construct a silken gallery around the stem base and roots of their host plant. Larvae are mainly found in May and June and it is thought the species overwinters in the larval stage. Pupation takes place in a silken cocoon in the soil near the food plant.

References

External links
Lepiforum.de

Moths described in 1813
Anerastiini
Moths of Asia
Moths of Europe
Moths of North America